The Windows of Heaven may refer to:
 "The Windows of Heaven" (short story), a 1956 short story by John Brunner
 The Windows of Heaven (film), a 1963 film about LDS Church President Lorenzo Snow

See also
 Windows of Heaven, an album by Jefferson Starship